Milan Pitlach (1 March 1943, Kroměříž, Czech Republic – 31 August 2021, Düsseldorf, Germany) was a Czech architect and photographer.

Biography and career
After attending school in Opava, Milan Pitlach studied at the Faculty of Architecture of the Czech Technical University in Prague. Following this he worked from 1966 till 1969 in Studio Delta of the Union of Architectural Studios (Sdružení projektových atelierů) in Prague. During 1969–1970 he had an internship with Yorke, Rosenberg & Mardall in London. After his return to Prague he was again employed by Studio Delta with the Design Institute of Prague /PÙ VHMP/. In 1981 he immigrated to the German Federal Republic, where he settled in Düsseldorf. There he worked first with Dansard, Kalenborn & Partner, Heuser Architects, between 1984–1989 and then in the office of O. M. Ungers in Cologne. From 2003 till 2009 he lived in Shanghai, working as a chief architect of Archlong Group Co. He ran an office in Düsseldorf.

It was during his internship in London that Milan Pitlach began taking photographs. His first photographic exhibition was held in Reduta Club in Prague in 1972. Since that he has had some forty individual exhibitions, taken part in many group exhibitions and published his photographic work in a series of books and catalogs.

Architectural work
Milan Pitlach's architectural language derives from the tradition of modern Czech architecture.
“The main premises of my designs are economy of volume, but also of layout and an effort to create space. Concepts are based on elementary volumes, which, however much they may be distorted, leave a sense of their original shape.” (Milan Pitlach: Introduction to the book Shanghai Concepts). Pitlach avoids formal subjectivism, which manifests itself through pretentious gestures and ornaments of different kinds. From the outset Pitlach has concentrated on the design much more than the planning of works. During the four decades of his professional career he has developed very many concepts; in Czechoslovakia, Great Britain, Germany or China. These concepts are not only architectural but also large scale urban schemes. (After all, he graduated from Professor Krises's town-planning department of CVUT). Pitlach has reflected on his attitude to architecture in several critical essays, for example in Architektura CSR and Architekt, as well as Revolver Revue and its Critical Supplement. He has also taught as a visiting professor at Bergische Universität in Wuppertal (1984–1985) and at his alma mater, The Czech Technical University in Prague (1992–1993).

Architectural work (selected projects)
 1968 – New South-West Town, Prague, competition entry
 1968 – Embassy of ČSR, Stockholm, competition entry
 1971 – Recreation Centre of Trade Unions, Staré Splavy, design
 1975 – New Satellite Town Lipence, Prague, master plan
 1975 – Family House, Bílovec
 1975 – Exhibition of Jan Svoboda, Brno, Moravská galerie, design
 1977 – Flats for Teachers of School for Children of Foreigner Residents, Prague
 1978 – Residential Unit in Prague - Střešovice
 1978 – Family House, Ostrava – Dobroslavice
 1980 – Headquarters of the Federal Statistic Agency, Prague, design
 1985 – Federal Court, Karlsruhe (for the studio of O.M. Ungers)
 1986 – Progetto Biccoca, Milan (for the studio of O.M. Ungers)
 1986 – Kunstahalle Düsseldorf, competition entry (for the studio of O.M. Ungers)
 1987 – Messepalast Vienna, competition entry (for the studio of O.M. Ungers)
 1987 – Mediapark Cologne, competition entry (for the studio of O.M. Ungers)
 1988 – Fortrezza di Basso, Firenze, concept (for the studio of O.M. Ungers)
 1989 – Administrative Building BIBA, Bremen (for the studio of O.M. Ungers)
 1992 – Apprentice School of Bayer Comp., Uerdingen
 1993 – Central Railway Station Administrative and Congress Center, Prague, competition entry
 1994 – City Passage, Herne
 1995 – Remodelling of Old Town Square, Třebíč, competition entry
 2000 – Alteration of Laboratories of BAYER Comp., Wuppertal
 2003 – villa Bethanienturm, Berlin, design
 2003 – JMS Office Building, Shanghai, competition entry
 2004 – South Club on MJN - Island, Tianjin, design
 2004 – Administrative Building Block #114, Jing An District, Shanghai, design
 2004 – International Art Centre, Shanghai
 2004 – Shanghai Jewish Memorial, Shanghai, competition entry
 2005 – Extension of Hongqiao Airport and Railway Station, Shanghai, competition entry
 2005 – Greenland Restaurant, Shanghai, design
 2006 – New City Centre, Changqing, design
 2007 – East Tai Hu Lake Development Plan, Suzhou, competition entry
 2008 – Residential District, Taohuajie, design
 2010 – Apartment House Mirbachplatz, Berlin, design

Awards
Of several of his projects and competition entries, some have been awarded the highest prize: Master Plan of Traffic Flow of Prague-Liben (1980), Kunsthalle Düsseldorf (1986), Messepalast Vienna (ex equo 1987), Mediapark Cologne (ex equo 1987), Administrative Building BIBA Bremen (1989), Modification of Karlovo Square, Třebíč (1996), Administrative Building Block #114, Jing An District, Shanghai (2004), Shanghai Jewish Memorial, Shanghai (2004), Cultural Zone Min Hang, Shanghai (2005), East Tai Hu Lake Development Plan, Suzhou (2007). Among other prize-winning projects were: New South-West Town, Prague (1968), Playgrounds for Children (1971), Extension of the Town Library, Fulda (1986), Residential Ensemble, Solingen (1990), Central Railway Station Administrative and Congress Center, Prague (1993), Station of Suspended Railway, Wuppertal (1993), Master Plan of Industrial Zone, Schweinfurt (1995), Modification of Komenský and Masaryk Square, Třebíč (1996).

Exhibitions
 2004 – Artsea Gallery, Shanghai, Shanghai Jewish Memorial
 2012 – House of Arts, Cabinet of Architecture /GVUO/ Ostrava, Shanghai Concepts
 2012 – Industrial Gallery, Ostrava, Sketches
 2012 – House of Arts, OKO Opava, 3 x Milan Pitlach / Shanghai works

Photographic work
London in 1969 made Milan Pitlach a photographer. “He was fascinated by the new subject-matter and the evidence of a life-style which he empathised with and admired and which he quickly adopted. And because it seemed to him very significant, he wanted to record it. … He did this in photographs and diaries, both forms of expression; because more than an abstract and professional approach to reality we find here an attitude of somebody who wants and must both visually and literally give an account of an important personal experience, perhaps a key event of his life.” On his return to Czechoslovakia he continued taking photographs as a document of the gloomy Czech reality of the Husak period. A similar motivation and aesthetic marks the work produced on the travels he made during that decade (Poland, East Germany, Soviet Union). At that time he developed a subjective line, portraying the “small” world around him. These pictures were exhibited at Dokumenta 1997 and published in a book with the title Deníky / Diaries.
Since his emigration to West Germany (1981) he has enjoyed the possibility of free movement, and this has resulted in an intensification of his photographic activities. In his work of the Eighties, a period marked by many journeys (France, Italy, Japan, USA), the most extensive collection of photographs is from India. “In his photographs from India, which he made ten years after his English photographs we encounter formal virtuosity. Pitlach balances his compositions with professional certainty and elegance… He treats the counterpoint of light and shadow almost in the manner of the masters of the Baroque.” (Helena Honcoopová – Photographs from India, Catalogue of an exhibition, National Gallery Prague). The last of Pitlach’s major themes has been China, where he spent six years working as an architect. Recently a more elegiac and contemplative style has characterized much of his photographic output. One example is The Gospel According to Matthew, which was exhibited in the National Library in Prague (2001) and appeared as a book in 2004; other various collections have been published, for example Landscapes According to Friedrich Nietzsche, Fragments, Calligraphies and Gaspar de la Nuit.

Exhibitions (selected)
 1972 – Reduta, Prague, Ostrov / The Island
 1976 – Moravian Gallery, Brno, Londýnský deník / London Diary (exhibition was forbidden by authorities)
 1977 – Gallery Creative Camera, London, London Diary
 1983 – Gallery Porta Dromedaris, Enkhuisen, Photographs from Czechoslovakia
 1984 – Gallery K, Tokyo, Footnotes
 1992 – Galerie Manes, Prague, Czech Photography in Exile
 1994 – Galerie Fronta, Prague, Milan Pitlach
 1997 – Interkamera, Prague, Deníky / Diaries
 2000 – Národní galerie, Prague, Fotografie z Indie / Photographs from India
 2000 – Czech Cultural Centre, Dresden, Photographs from Czechoslovakia of the Seventies
 2000 – Tanzhaus NRW, Düsseldorf, Tänze des Alltags / About Dance
 2000 – Gallery Obecní dům, Prague, Museum Helsinki, We 1948-1989 (Exhibition of Moravian Gallery, Brno)
 2001 – Moravian Gallery, Brno, Londýnský deník / London Diary
 2001 – National Library, Prague, Evangelium podle Matouše / Gospel According to Matthew
 2002 – British Council, Prague, Londýnský deník / London Diary
 2003 – Gallery Werkstat, Blankenheim, Fragments
 2003 – Artsea Gallery, Shanghai, Four Foreigner Photographers
 2004 – Artsea Gallery, Shanghai, Eyes Wide
 2005 – Arts and Crafts Museum, Prague, Česká fotografie 20. století / Czech Photography of 20th Century
 2008 – National Gallery Prague, Calligraphy
 2008 – Moravian Gallery, Brno, Třetí strana zdi / Third side of the Wall (Exhibition of Moravian Gallery)
 2010 – Gallery Fiducia, Ostrava, Sůl země / Fotografie z Ostravy / Salt of the Earth
 2012 – Museum of Town Ostrava, Ostrava, Kaligrafie / Calligraphy
 2013 – Industrial Gallery, Ostrava, Kašpar noci podle Ravela / Gaspard de la Nuit d´après Ravel
 2013 – House of Arts, Cabinet of Architecture /GVUO/ Ostrava, Le Corbusier - Chandigarh

References

Bibliography

Architectural work
 Architektura 7/68, New South-West Town, Prague
 Architektura 10/71, Playgrounds for Children, Prague
 PU VHMP, Annual Report 1972, Recreation Centre of Trade Unions, Staré Splavy
 Casabella, 524/1986, Projetto Bicocca, Milan
 Domus, 377/1986, Projetto Bicocca, Milan
 Casabella, 536/1987, Urban Park, Salemi
 Casabella, 544/1988, Messepalast, Vienna
 Casabella, 546/1988, Mediapark, Cologne
 Architekt, 10/92, 1992 Apprentice School of Bayer Comp., Uerdingen
 Projekt, 4/92, Town hall, Lage / Lippe
 Fassade, 1/1994, Apprentice School of Bayer Comp., Uerdingen
 New Encyclopaedia of Czech Visual Artists, 1995
 Revolver Revue, 50/2002, Space in Architecture
 Kritická příloha RR 28/2004, Walk through the Castle of Prague
 Vision 1/2005, CN, Shanghai Jewish Memorial
 Milan Pitlach: Shanghai Concepts, a publication of Archlog Group Co., Shanghai 2009
 Architekt 1/2011, Shanghai Jewish Memorial

Many works have been shown at exhibitions of projects and competition entries and published in architectural magazines such as Wettbewerb Actuell, Baumeister, Architekt, Architektura, Project.

Photographic work
 1973 Revue Fotografie 3/1973, London Diary
 1999 Revolver Revue 40, Messages
 2001 Revolver Revue 44, Photographs from Czechoslovakia of the Seventies
 2003 Revolver Revue 51, Practical Hydrology /with Prokop Voskovec/
 2004 Revolver Revue 56, Landscapes according to Friedrich Nietzsche
 2004 Vision Magazine, CN, 8/2004, Eyes Wide
 2005 Vision Magazine, CN, 5/2005, Milan Pitlach / The Art of Seeing
 2007 Revolver Revue 65, Imaginary Portraits
 2009 Revolver Revue 77, Calligraph

Books and Catalogues – Photographic work
 Momentaufnahme, W.H.Thesing, Wuppertal 1997
 Deníky / Diaries, TORST, Prague 1999, 
 Fotografie z Indie / Photographs from India, catalogue of National Gallery, Prague 2000, 
 Milan Pitlach, FOTO-MIDA, České Budějovice 2001, 
 Evangelium podle Matouše / Gospel according to Matthew, KANT, Prague 2004, 
 Kaligrafie / Calligraphy, catalogue of National Gallery, Prague 2008
 Sůl země / Salt of the Earth, MONTANEX, Ostrava 2011,

External links
 Milan Pitlach | Šanghajské koncepty - pozvánka na výstavu archiweb.cz 26. 3. 2012
 Architekt a fotograf Milan Pitlach se představuje Ostravě, ceskatelevize.cz 2. 4. 2012
 Ostravská výstava představuje architektonické koncepty Milana Pitlacha novinky.cz 30. 3. 2012
 Ostravský Dům umění hostí tři architektonické výstavy novinky.cz 5. 4. 2013
 Fotografie Milana Pitlacha jsou k vidění v Industrial Gallery v Ostravě novinky.cz 7. 8. 2013

Living people
1943 births
Czech architects
Czech photographers